The men's 50m backstroke events at the 2022 World Para Swimming Championships were held at the Penteada Olympic Swimming Complex in Madeira between 12 and 18 June.

Medalists

Results

S1

S2

S3

S4

S5
Final
Eight swimmers from seven nations took part.

References

2022 World Para Swimming Championships